The Bangladesh Tea Board or BTB, an autonomous body responsible for creating laws regarding tea production, controlling and encouraging the production of tea and is located in Nasirabad, Chittagong, Bangladesh. It is under the Ministry of Commerce.

History
Pakistan Tea Board was established in 1951 through the passage of Pakistan Tea Act. The first president of Bangladesh, Sheikh Mujibur Rahman, was chairman of the board in 1957. The act was replaced with Tea Ordinance in 1959.

After the Independence of Bangladesh, the Bangladesh, Tea Ordinance in 1977 created a three member board and expanded to eleven with the Tea (Amendment) Ordinance in1986.

The board was established through the Tea Ordinance in 1977.  The board moved its headquarters from Dhaka to Chittagong in 1984.

In March 2018, Chairman Md Shafeenul Islam of the tea board was made head of Border Guards Bangladesh and was replaced with Major General Md Jahangir Al Mustahidur Rahman.

Three employees of the board received the National Integrity Award in 2022. It sought to increase tea cess from 1 percent to two percent. The board helped tea production in Bangladesh reach a 168 year high.

References

Organisations based in Chittagong
1977 establishments in Bangladesh
Tea industry in Bangladesh
Economy of Chittagong
Government boards of Bangladesh